Thomas William Cyril Gilhespy (born 18 February 1898 - 1985) is an English former footballer who made almost 200 Football League appearances for seven different clubs as an outside right.

Career
Cyril Gilhespy played locally for Chester le Street. 
He joined Sunderland in July 1920 playing First Division football at Roker Park. Gilhespy moved to Liverpool in 1921 and featured in their League Division One champions teams in both 1921-22 and 1922–23. 
Alex Raisbeck paid £350 in May 1925 to sign Gilhespy for Bristol City. Gilhespy made his debut at outside right in a 0–1 defeat v Norwich City on 29 August 1925 making 35 appearances scoring 6 goals in his first season with the "Robins". When Bristol City finished winners of the Third Division South in 1926-27 Gilhespy made 40 appearances scoring 8 goals including one in the 9–4 victory over Gillingham on 15 January 1927 when Tot Walsh netted a record six goals. In the following season Gilhespy began by scoring in each of the opening five games including 2 goals in a 4–1 win at Grimsby Town but made only 14 appearances scoring 7 goals that season. Gilhespy was a regular in 1928-29 making 28 appearances scoring 4 goals in his final season playing for Bristol City. 
Gilhespy returned to First Division football with Blackburn Rovers in June 1929 then played for Reading, Mansfield Town and Crewe Alexandra.

Honours
with Bristol City
Football League Third Division South winner: 1926–27

References

External links
 LFC History profile

1898 births
1985 deaths
Association football outside forwards
English footballers
Sunderland A.F.C. players
Liverpool F.C. players
Bristol City F.C. players
Blackburn Rovers F.C. players
Reading F.C. players
Mansfield Town F.C. players
Crewe Alexandra F.C. players
English Football League players